Castrillo de Cabrera, Castriellu de Cabreira in Leonese language, is a municipality located in the province of León, Castile and León, Spain. According to the 2010 census (INE), the municipality has a population of 152 inhabitants spread over the six villages that make up the municipality. Those six villages are Castrillo de Cabrera, the municipal seat, Marrubio (Manrubiu), Noceda de Cabrera (Ñoceda de Cabreira), Nogar (Ñugare), Odollo (Udoyu) and Saceda (Saceda).

Language
Leonese language is widely spoken in all the shire because of the isolation this area has experienced - and still does - through the years, making it easier for the language to survive than in other areas in the province of León.

See also
 León (province)
 Leonese language

References

Municipalities in the Province of León